Cyber Coach is a Virtual Dance Instructor and Dance Mat system created by Quick Controls Ltd of Bolton, UK.

The system comprises a touch screen controller, a projector, sound system and some dance pads.

The dance pads are wireless and can be used to play one of several games including: Space Blaster, Disco Disco, Nimbler Numbers and Wiggle.

The system was shortlisted for a BETT Award in 2009  and won a National Business Award for Innovation in 2009.

Lancashire Grid for Learning undertook a comprehensive review of the system in 2009 and endorsed the system to their schools.

A version for primary schools called "Cyber Coach Smart" has been launched.

In 2017, Cyber Coach and Manchester Metropolitan University launched Emile Education

References

Dance teachers
Dance video games
Music video games